Kentucky Energy and Environment Cabinet is a government organization in the US state of Kentucky.  The current Cabinet Secretary is Rebecca Goodman.

Notes

Links 
 Kentucky Energy and Environment Cabinet - Official webpage

State agencies of Kentucky
State departments of education of the United States